Galerix is a prehistoric genus of gymnures. Fossils of these hedgehog-like creatures are found in Europe, Africa, and Asia.

Taxonomy

Nine species are recognized as members of the genus:

Galerix aurelianensis
Galerix exilis
Galerix kostakii
Galerix remmerti
Galerix rutlandae
Galerix saratji
Galerix stehlini
Galerix symeonidisi
Galerix uenayae

References

Gymnures
Prehistoric Eulipotyphla
Oligocene mammals of Africa
Miocene mammals of Africa
Pliocene mammals of Africa
Oligocene mammals of Asia
Miocene mammals of Asia
Pliocene mammals of Asia
Oligocene mammals of Europe
Miocene mammals of Europe
Pliocene mammals of Europe
Fossil taxa described in 1848
Prehistoric placental genera